Isidro Tom Ungab (born May 8, 1961) is a Filipino politician, a former banker, and a former local legislator of the City of Davao. He was elected as a member of the House of Representatives of the Philippines, representing the Third District of Davao City beginning in 2007.

Ungab attended the University of the Philippines Los Baños and attained a Bachelor of Science degree in Agricultural Economics. He finished his Advanced Bank Management Program (ABMP) at the Asian Institute of Management, Master of Public Administration from the Development Academy of the Philippines, and the Command and General Staff Course in Camp General Emilio Aguinaldo.

He had worked as an economic analyst, account officer, development bank manager and as a consultant to various financial institutions. He entered politics in 1995 and was elected as city councilor of Davao City for nine consecutive years. In the May 2007 elections, he ran as a 3rd District Congressman and was re-elected in 2010 for his second term. He ran unopposed in his third and last term as congressman of the 3rd district of Davao City. Ungab served as chairman of the Committee on Ways and Means in the Fifteenth Congress and was primarily responsible for the passage of the law amending the excise taxes for tobacco and alcohol otherwise known as the Sin Tax Law of 2012. He now serves as chairman of the powerful Committee on Appropriations in the Sixteenth Congress.

Military service

Ungab is also a reserve Philippine Army officer in the Army Reserve with the rank of colonel, he was formerly the battalion commander of the 3rd Metro Davao Infantry Battalion (Ready Reserve) ( as a  lieutenant colonel then) and currently the commanding officer of the 2202nd Infantry Brigade (Ready Reserve) PA, assumed that post after his promotion to colonel. Both units under the 22nd Infantry Division (Philippines). He is also a member of the U. P. Vanguard Inc and the Reserve Officers Legion of the Philippines (ROLP).

External links 
 Ungab signs scholarship pact for poor students at Sunstar.com
 

People from Davao City
1961 births
Living people
Liberal Party (Philippines) politicians
Members of the House of Representatives of the Philippines from Davao City
Filipino city and municipal councilors
Asian Institute of Management alumni
University of the Philippines Los Baños alumni